, wind power in the Netherlands has an installed capacity of 8,714 MW, 28.2% of which is based offshore. In 2019, the wind turbines provided the country with 12% of its electricity demand during the year, a figure that is growing but somewhat below the average of 15% that wind power provides across the whole of the EU's electricity consumption. The Dutch are trying to meet the EU-set target of producing 14% of total energy use from renewable sources by 2020, and 16% by 2023.
Windmills have historically played a major part in the Netherlands by providing an alternative to water driven mills.

In March 2022, the Dutch government announced that by 2030 offshore wind was to become the Netherlands' biggest power source, aiming at 21 GW of installed capacity.

Since 2015 there has been a trend towards the deployment and planning for large wind farms, both onshore and offshore, with a view to the approximate tripling wind power capacity from 2015 levels by 2023. The first of these, the 429 MW Noordoostpolder wind farm was already partially deployed by year end 2015 whilst the 600 MW Gemini offshore wind farm was commissioned in 2017. These newer and larger wind farms are making use of some of the largest wind turbines available, in particular in the case of Noordoostpolder the Enercon E-126 7500 kW wind turbine, the largest onshore turbine available at that time. The Netherlands is also well prepared for a significant rise in the production of intermittent power from wind energy by good linkages to its neighbours via high voltage cables enabling power to be imported or exported as required. These include the 580 km NorNed submarine cable (700 MW) link to Norway, the 1,000 MW BritNed cable link to the United Kingdom and the COBRA cable link to Denmark (700 MW).

Many of the numerous smaller and older wind farms in the Netherlands consist of much smaller turbines compared to those typically deployed today. These were often manufactured by lesser known wind turbine manufacturers, sometimes producing innovative products such as the Nedwind 2 blade turbine. Many of these smaller companies were eventually acquired by the larger wind turbine manufactures such as Vestas, Siemens and Lagerwey.

Installed capacity

Future targets 
The Dutch government has set a target of 6,000 MW nameplate capacity of onshore wind power by 2020 (not met, as per the data above) and 4,450 MW of offshore wind power by 2023. This will contribute towards the Dutch target of 14% renewable energy use out of total energy use by 2020 and 16% by 2023. In 2020 wind power provided 11.54% of the Dutch electricity generation (see table above) while solar power provided an additional 7.25% for a combined 18.79% - easily meeting the target without taking other renewable sources into account, even though the target for onshore wind capacity was not met.

For offshore wind a new system of tendering is under development. New wind farm deployment is based on the SER agreement that describes a plan for five years of tendering 700 MW per year. Under this system the government chooses locations and organizes tenders for projects of 350 MW, and project developers can offer bids for each farm. These sites are also surveyed centrally by the government allowing developers to avoid costly and multiple surveys.

Turbine manufacturers and repowering 
Many small scale wind farms exist throughout the Netherlands which bear testament to earlier models of wind turbines and lesser known manufacturers which provided a range of niche products, ranging in size and power output. There are several Dutch turbine manufacturers that continue to manufacture both large and small installations for domestic and international clients. Smaller turbines are often used for off grid, bespoke and community power internationally.

Some of the newer larger wind farms currently under construction are replacing smaller turbines previously installed at given locations. One such example is the largest wind farm in Holland, Noordoostpolder, which is installing industrial scale wind turbines such as the new Enercon onshore wind turbines, at the time the largest onshore turbines in the world rated at 7500 kW nameplate capacity. The wind farm demonstrates the growth in scale in wind power as between 1987 and 1991 it was the largest of its kind in Europe with 50 turbines and a total nameplate capacity of 15 MW. The new Zuidwester site at the wind farm will have just 12 turbines and a total nameplate capacity of 90 MW. A second hand market for turbines also exists, which could grow as older turbines are replaced by larger newer ones.

Timeline of developments 

2022

In February 2022 the Netherlands announced it increased its offshore wind target to 21 GW by 2030. That would meet approximately 75% of the countries electricity needs. With this, offshore wind energy makes an important contribution to achieving the increased climate target of 55% less -emissions.

2018

In March 2018 the Dutch government announced that it will build between 2023 and 2030 several new windfarms with a total installed capacity of 7 gigawatt. Where the parks will come and how they will be built is still being discussed. However, the government wants 40% of the total electricity used in 2030 in the Netherlands to be supplied by wind.

2016

In the first week of December 2016, all 150 turbines of the new 600 MW Gemini offshore windfarm began producing power, and the project is expected to be fully commissioned by mid 2017. In July 2016, the first two stages of offshore wind farm development for a combined 700 MegaWatt capacity in a water area near Borssele was awarded to DONG Energy at a price of 7.27 Euro cent per kilowatt hour for 15 years. Transmission costs of 1.4 eurocent/kWh is to be added as TenneT is required to take power from sea to shore.[10] [11] [12]

2015
2015 was a record year for new installations in the Netherlands with 586 MW added of which 180 MW were offshore. This record was immediately beaten the following year with another 766 MW being added.

The Dutch government has expressed the aspiration to build 4.450 MW of offshore wind power by 2023 which will have a considerable impact on the Dutch electricity grid, operated by TenneT. [9] As a first step, the government has determined 65 sites for offshore wind farms in the North Sea and IJsselmeer. [1]

2013

By December 2013, 1,975 wind turbines were operational on land in the Netherlands, with an aggregate capacity of 2,479 MW. An additional 228 MW of capacity was installed at sea.

2011

In November 2011, the Dutch government decided to no longer fund €6 billion per year to maintain subsidized wind kWh at €0.18. It sharply cut subsidies down to €1.5 billion, leaving private sector to carry over wind turbine investments should these be beneficial.[6]

Onshore wind power 

Whilst there are a growing number of large onshore wind farms in Holland, most of the onshore farms in 2015 consisted of a large number of small wind farms, including many single installation turbines as well as farms of between 1–10 turbines. In total there were 3,004 MW of onshore wind power at the end of 2015. Most wind power is produced in the province of Flevoland. A few of the larger wind farms are listed here.

Noordoostpolder 
The largest wind farm in the Netherlands is Noordoostpolder with a capacity of 429 MW. The farm consists of three smaller wind farms owned by separate organisations with local community links. The wind farm's 86 wind turbines will produce 1.4 billion kWh of electricity, enough. power for over 400,000 households every day, a figure roughly equivalent to the number of households in the Northern Netherlands.

Westereems 

The next largest onshore wind farm is the Westereems wind farm located in Eemshaven in Groningen, in the north of the Netherlands.

Princess Alexia 
Up until the Westereems Wind Park was commissioned the largest onshore wind farm was the Princess Alexia Windpark in Zeewolde (122MW), consisting of 36 REpower turbines and a 3.2MW/33MWh battery storage power station of BMW i3 batteries. Other large wind farms are located in Delfzijl-zuid (43 MW), Lelystad (46 MW), Terneuzen, (Koegorspolder, 44 MW), and Biddinghuizen (WP Kubbeweg, 34 MW).

Rachel Carson 
The Rachel Carson wind farm (also known as the Eemmeerdijk Wind Park.) remarkably consists of wind turbines with just 2 blades, manufactured by Nedwind, the 18 turbines have a combined nominal power of 18 MW.

Offshore wind power 

In contrast to onshore wind farms, almost all turbines by January 2017 were situated in just a few large wind farms.

Future offshore wind farms

Luchterduinen 
The Eneco Luchterduinen wind farm was officially opened in September 2015 and is a 50/50 joint venture between Dutch energy company Eneco and Japan's Mitsubishi corporation. The 129 MW Eneco Luchterduinen wind farm is located 23 km off the coast between Zandvoort and Noordwijk cities in the Netherlands. The farm consists of 43 Vestas V112 turbines of 3 MW capacity each. A further 228 MW of installed capacity will be added when completed.

Princess Amalia 
In 2008, a second, somewhat larger offshore wind farm was built: the Princess Amalia Wind Farm, consisting of 60 Vestas V80 2MW turbines totaling 120 MW, sufficient to power 125,000 homes and help the Netherlands cut 225,000 tonnes of carbon dioxide emissions.[2] [6] The wind park was developed off the coast of IJmuiden by Econcern and Eneco Energie, at a total cost of $522.3 million.[6]

Egmond aan Zee (OWEZ) 
In 2006, the Egmond aan Zee Offshore Wind Farm was built, consisting of 36 Vestas V90 3MW turbines, totaling 108 MW, sufficient to light 100,000 houses.[1] [2] [7] The project cost $272 million and is cooperatively owned by Royal Dutch Shell and the Dutch utility company Nuon.

Lely 
Built 1992 this nearshore wind farm had just 4 Nedwind 500 KW turbines based 1 km to shore. The farm was dismantled after 22 years service in 2016.

See also
Community wind energy
Solar power in the Netherlands
Hydroelectric power in the Netherlands
Renewable energy in the Netherlands
Renewable energy by country

Notes

References